Melissandre Fuentes (born 1 March 1988 in Canillo) is an Andorran figure skater. She is the 2004 and 2005 Andorran national champion. Her younger sister Lydia Fuentes competes internationally on the junior level.

Fuentes is the first female skater to represent Andorra at an ISU Championship, which she accomplished at the 2002 World Junior Figure Skating Championships.

Competitive highlights 
JGP: Junior Grand Prix

References 

1988 births
Living people
Andorran figure skaters